Bryan Anthony Smolinski (born December 27, 1971) is an American former professional ice hockey center. The Boston Bruins drafted him 21st overall in 1990. He played in the National Hockey League (NHL) for the Pittsburgh Penguins, New York Islanders, Los Angeles Kings, Ottawa Senators, Chicago Blackhawks, Vancouver Canucks and Montreal Canadiens. He had also previously played with the Port Huron Icehawks of the International Hockey League (IHL).

Playing career

Drafted
Smolinski grew up in Genoa, Ohio and graduated from Cardinal Stritch High School in Oregon, Ohio. He played junior hockey for the Stratford Cullitons and played college hockey for the Michigan State Spartans. After his freshman year, the Boston Bruins drafted him in the first round (21st overall) in the 1990 NHL Entry Draft. Smolinski completed a four-year tenure with the Spartans before joining the Bruins for the end of the 1992–93 season.

National Hockey League
In his rookie campaign of 1993–94 Smolinski tallied 31 goals and 51 points. After a 31-point season in the shortened 1994–95 campaign, Smolinski was traded in the summer of 1995 alongside Glen Murray to the Pittsburgh Penguins for Kevin Stevens and Shawn McEachern. In his only season with the Penguins in 1995–96, he scored a career-high 40 assists and 64 points. However, Smolinski and the Penguins could not agree on a new contract in the off-season and he sat out the start of the next season, playing for the Detroit Vipers of the IHL. In November 1996, general manager Mike Milbury of the New York Islanders traded defenseman Darius Kasparaitis and rookie Andreas Johansson for the rights to negotiate a contract with Smolinski.

Smolinski played three seasons for the Islanders before being traded in June 1999 as part of an eight-player deal that saw him, Žigmund Pálffy, goaltender Marcel Cousineau, and fourth-round selection previously acquired from the New Jersey Devils (Daniel Johansson) traded to the Los Angeles Kings for Olli Jokinen, Josh Green, Mathieu Biron, and a first-round selection (Taylor Pyatt). Smolinski played four seasons for the Kings, before being traded to the Ottawa Senators at the trade deadline for defense prospect Tim Gleason on March 11, 2003.

During the 2004–05 NHL lockout, Smolinski was an assistant hockey coach at Cranbrook Kingswood before briefly playing for the Motor City Mechanics of the United Hockey League (UHL). Returning to the Senators for the 2005–06 season, he was traded in the subsequent off-season on July 9, 2006, to the Chicago Blackhawks in a three-way deal with the Senators and San Jose Sharks.   Smolinski started the 2006–07 season with the Blackhawks but was later traded prior to the trade deadline to the Vancouver Canucks on February 26, 2007, for a conditional second round draft pick.

Becoming a free agent in the 2007 off-season, Smolinski signed a one-year contract with the Montreal Canadiens on July 2, 2007.  On October 22, Smolinski played in his 1,000th career game, against the Bruins.

After the NHL
After his stint with the Montreal Canadiens, Smolinski began an assistant coaching job for a Michigan high school team, Birmingham Unified.  With Smolinski's help, the team became District Champions for the first time in four years.

Without an NHL job, on February 24, 2009, Smolinski signed a deal with the Port Huron Icehawks of the IHL. On April 30, 2009, Smolinski signed a deal with the Milwaukee Admirals of the AHL. He is currently working with the National Hockey League as a regional director in their Learn To Play (LTP) program. In 2015, he was inducted into the National Polish-American Sports Hall of Fame.

Smolinski also referees high school hockey in Michigan.

Career statistics

Regular season and playoffs

International

See also
List of NHL players with 1000 games played

Championships
2016 Michigan Amateur Hockey Association 30+ Recreational Division State Champions

Awards and honors

References

External links

1971 births
American men's ice hockey centers
Boston Bruins draft picks
Boston Bruins players
Chicago Blackhawks players
Detroit Vipers players
Ice hockey players from Ohio
Living people
Los Angeles Kings players
Michigan State Spartans men's ice hockey players
Milwaukee Admirals players
Montreal Canadiens players
Motor City Mechanics players
National Hockey League first-round draft picks
New York Islanders players
Ottawa Senators players
People from Genoa, Ohio
Pittsburgh Penguins players
Port Huron Icehawks players
Vancouver Canucks players
Sportspeople from Toledo, Ohio
American people of Polish descent
AHCA Division I men's ice hockey All-Americans